Carrie Katherine "Kate" Richards O'Hare (March 26, 1876 – January 10, 1948) was an American Socialist Party activist, editor, and orator best known for her controversial imprisonment during World War I.

Biography

Early years
Carrie Katherine Richards was born March 26, 1876, in Ottawa County, Kansas. Her father, Andrew Richards (c. 1846–1916), was the son of slaveowners who had come to hate the institution, enlisting as a bugler and drummer boy in the Union Army at the outbreak of the American Civil War in 1861. Following the conclusion of the war he had married his childhood sweetheart and moved to the western Kansas frontier, where he and his wife Lucy brought up Kate and her four siblings, raising the children as socialists from an early age.

O'Hare briefly worked as a teacher in Nebraska before becoming an apprentice machinist in her native Kansas. After being moved by a speech by labor activist Mary Harris Jones, she became drawn into socialist politics. She married fellow socialist Frank P. O'Hare.

Political career
She unsuccessfully ran as a candidate for the United States Congress in Kansas on the Socialist ticket in 1910.

In the pages of the National Rip-Saw, a St. Louis-based socialist journal in the 1910s, O'Hare championed reforms in favor of the working class and toured the country as an orator. In 1916 the Socialist Party of Missouri named O'Hare its candidate for U.S. Senate, heading the Socialist ticket in the state.

After America's entry into World War I in 1917, O'Hare led the Socialist Party's Committee on War and Militarism. For giving an anti-war speech in Bowman, North Dakota, O'Hare was convicted and sent to prison by federal authorities for violating the Espionage Act of 1917, an act criminalizing interference with recruitment and enlistment of military personnel. With no federal penitentiaries for women existing at the time, she was delivered to Missouri State Penitentiary on a five-year sentence in 1919, but was pardoned in 1920 after a nationwide campaign to secure her release. In prison, O'Hare met the anarchists Emma Goldman and Gabriella Segata Antolini, and worked with them to improve prison conditions.

After her release and the war's end, support for the Amnesty movement waned. In April 1922, to free America's "Political Prisoners" she led the "Children’s Crusade", a cross country march, to prod President Harding to release others convicted of the same 1917 Espionage act she had been convicted. With support of the fledgling ACLU, the women and children stood at the gates of the White House for almost two months before Harding met with them, ultimately releasing many of the prisoners of conscience.

O'Hare, unlike Socialist Party leader Eugene V. Debs and other prominent socialists at the time, was a supporter of racial segregation, and penned a 1912 pamphlet titled "Nigger" Equality, which attempted to appeal to Southern voters.

Later years
Kate O'Hare divorced Frank O'Hare in June 1928 and married the engineer and businessman Charles C. Cunningham in California in November of the same year. Despite her continued involvement in politics, much of O'Hare's prominence gradually faded. O'Hare worked on behalf of Upton Sinclair's radical populist campaign in the 1934 California gubernatorial election, and briefly served on the staff of Wisconsin Progressive Party politician Thomas R. Amlie in 1937–38. Esteemed as a penal reform advocate, she served as an assistant director of the California Department of Penology in 1939–40.

Death and legacy
O'Hare died in Benicia, California, on January 10, 1948.

See also
List of people pardoned or granted clemency by the president of the United States

References

Works
 Americanism and Bolshevism. St. Louis, MO: F. P. O’Hare, 1919.
 "How I Became a Socialist Agitator," Socialist Woman [Girard, KS], October 1908, pp. 4–5.
 In Prison. New York: A.A. Knopf, 1923. (Internet Archive)
 "Nigger" Equality. St. Louis, MO: National Rip-Saw, 1912.
 Socialism and the World War. St. Louis, MO: F. P. O’Hare, 1919.
 The Sorrows of Cupid. St. Louis, MO: National Rip-Saw, 1912.

Further reading
 Neil K. Basen, "Kate Richards O'Hare: The 'First Lady' of American Socialism, 1901–1917," Labor History, vol. 21, no. 2 (Spring 1980), pp. 165–199.
 Peter J. Buckingham, Rebel Against Injustice: The Life of Frank P. O'Hare. Columbia, MO: University of Missouri Press, 1996.
 J. Louis Engdahl, Debs and O’Hare in Prison. Chicago: Socialist Party, [1919?].
 Philip S. Foner, and Sally M. Miller (eds.), Kate Richards O'Hare: Selected Writings and Speeches. Baton Rouge, LA: Louisiana State University Press, 1982.
 
 Kathleen Kennedy, "Casting An Evil Eye on the Youth of the Nation: Motherhood and Political Subversion in the Wartime Prosecution of Kate Richards O'Hare, 1917-1924," American Studies, vol. 39, no. 3 (Fall 1998), pp. 105–129. In JSTOR
 Stanley Mallach, "Red Kate O'Hare Comes to Madison: The Politics of Free Speech," Wisconsin Magazine of History, vol. 53, no. 3 (Spring 1970), pp. 204–222. In JSTOR
 Sally M. Miller, From Prairie to Prison: The Life of Social Activist Kate Richards O'Hare. Columbia, MO: University of Missouri Press, 1993.
 Sally M. Miller, "A Path Approaching Full Circle: Kate Richards O'Hare," in Jacob H. Dorn (ed.), Socialism and Christianity in Early 20th Century America. Westport, CT: Greenwood Press, 1998.
 David Roediger, "Americanism and Fordism — American Style: Kate Richards O'Hare's 'Has Henry Ford Made Good?'" Labor History, vol. 29, no. 2 (1988), pp. 241–252.
 William Edward Zeuch, The Truth About the O’Hare Case. And Kate Richards O’Hare’s Address to the Court. St. Louis, MO: F.P. O’Hare, n.d. [c. 1919].

External links

Kate Richards O'Hare Letters. Schlesinger Library, Radcliffe Institute, Harvard University.
Lubna A. Alam and Elizabeth I. Perry, "How Did Kate Richards O'Hare's Conviction and Incarceration for Sedition during World War I Change Her Activism?" Women and Social Movements in the United States, 1600-2000, womhist.alexanderstreet.com/—Document collection.

1876 births
1948 deaths
20th-century American non-fiction writers
20th-century American politicians
20th-century American women writers
20th-century American women politicians
Activists from Kansas
American anti–World War I activists
American political activists
American political writers
American prisoners and detainees
American socialists
People from Ottawa County, Kansas
People convicted under the Espionage Act of 1917
Prisoners and detainees of the United States federal government
Recipients of American presidential pardons
Socialist Party of America politicians from Kansas
Socialist Party of America politicians from Missouri
Wisconsin Progressives (1924)
Women in Kansas politics
American women non-fiction writers